Shayta, also spelled Suhayta, S'heita or Su’heita, was a Syrian village located in the Golan Heights. It was one of only six Syrian villages in the Golan Heights still populated following the Six-Day War. After Israel occupied the area in 1967, Shayta's population census was 176 people, down from 200 in 1960. In 1967, Shayta was partially destroyed and a military post built in its place. Israel completely destroyed the village in 1971-72 and its population was forcibly transferred to the neighboring village of Mas'ade. Today, its former inhabitants are still campaigning for the return to their village. Shayta was located near the ceasefire line between Syrian and Israeli forces.

See also
 Syrian towns and villages depopulated in the Arab-Israeli conflict

References

Destroyed towns
Quneitra Governorate
Former populated places on the Golan Heights